Christopher Byrne may refer to:

 Christopher Byrne (politician) (1886–1957), Irish Cumann na nGaedheal and later Fianna Fáil politician
 Christopher Edward Byrne (1867–1950), American prelate of the Roman Catholic Church
 Chris Byrne (footballer) (born 1975), retired English footballer
 Chris Byrne (musician), musician with Black 47

See also

Byrne (surname)